Albert Lester Blue (October 19, 1881 – September 16, 1967) was a provincial politician from Alberta, Canada. He served as a member of the Legislative Assembly of Alberta from 1935 to 1940, sitting with the Social Credit caucus in government.

References

Alberta Social Credit Party MLAs
American emigrants to Canada
People from Buffalo County, Nebraska
1967 deaths
1881 births